Soma Valliyappan is an Indian writer, speaker, trainer, and an expert in the areas of Human Resource Management, Personality development, and Financial Investments. He has written over 60 books in Tamil and English on various subjects including self-development, the stock market, emotional intelligence, time management, sales, leadership, and personality development.

Career
Known for his erudite writing style, his articles and columns are widely published in leading Tamil newspapers and periodicals regularly. His book on Stock investing, titled Alla Alla Panam, released in 2004 by Kizhakku Publishers (New Horizon Media) has sold over 100,000 copies in about 5 years. The book introduces the basics of stock market and investment techniques to investors.

Valliyappan is an excellent speaker. He is regularly invited by many Tamil Television channels for his opinions on stock markets and economic events. He appears on several TV programs such as Star Vijay,  Doordarshan (Pothigai), Makkal TV, Kalaingar News, Puthia Thalaimurai TV etc. On 22 March 2019, he visited Erode sengunthar engineering college, Perundurai, Erode, he gave an excellent speech regarding current issues  of engineering students and encouraged the students to be n.o 1  in their field.

Birth and Education

Dr.Soma Valliappan was born on September 18, 1957 at Cuddalore, TN. He is a native of Devakottai. He is a Graduate in Economics from Madras University and Post Graduate in Business Administration with Human Resource and Marketing specializations. He has earned a Post Graduate Diploma in Personnel Management with a specialization in Personnel Management & Industrial Relations, from National Institute of Personnel Management Kolkatha. Prior to his graduation, he earned his Diploma in Hotel Management & Catering Technology at the Institute of Hotel Management & Catering Technology in Chennai. He was awarded Ph.D. by Madras university for his thesis on Emotional Intelligence.  He is also a certified Master Practitioner in NLP.

Professional Experience
Valliyappan has held several Senior and Executive positions in Human Resource Management in many organizations, representing Manufacturing, Financial services, and ITeS services sectors, including BHEL, Whirlpool and PepsiCo India Holdings, as well as Indian Hotels Co Ltd, Hindustan Motors Ltd, Cameo, and Navia Markets Ltd. Currently, Valliyappan runs a management consulting services company, Menmai Management Consultancy Services.

Human Resource Development

Valliyappan is a Life Member of the National HR Development Network (NHRD), India's premier association of Human Resource professionals committed to promoting the HR movement in the country. His areas of interest in HR include Strategic HR, Performance measurement and management, Reward and compensation, 360 degree feedback, Emotional intelligence, Balanced Score Card, and Personal effectiveness, among others.

Teaching and Training

Valliyappan is closely associated with academia. He has been teaching and training since 1990. Currently, he is a member of Board of Studies of Alagappa Institute of Management, Karaikudi. He was also a member of Board of Studies of St Joseph's College and Bishop Heber College, Trichy and was in the Selection Committee of Bharathidhasan Institute Management, Trichy and IIM Ranchi. He was a visiting faculty at Bharathidasan University, Tiruchirappalli and the Institute for Financial Management and Research (IFMR), Chennai.

On behalf of National Stock Exchange, Madras Stock Exchange, Securities Exchange Board of India, and South Indian Chamber of Commerce & Industry, he has spoken at a number of seminars for the public, as well as investors and management students, mainly on stock markets.

Writing

Books

HR, Investment and Management

Valliyappan's first book, Thittamiduvom Vetriperuvom, which dealt with Self-development, was published in the year 2002. His first book did well in the market and he continued authoring books such as Thottathellam Ponnaagum, Kaalam Ungal Kaladiyil etc. which introduced many specialized subjects in management for Tamil readers.

Valliyappan's Alla Alla Panam, published in August 2004 by Kizhakku Publishers (New Horizon Media), sold ten thousand copies in the first few months of its launch. In 2010, the book's sale crossed the one lakh copies sold mark.

Following the success of Alla Alla Panam, (AAP) which introduced the basics of stock markets, he wrote four more books on different aspects of the stock market and investment such as Technical & Fundamental analysis (AAP-2), Futures and Options( AAP-3), Portfolio Management (AAP-4) and Trading (AAP-5). Mutual Funds (AAP -6), Gold, silver & crypto (AAP-7) Insurance (AAP-8).

Soon, Valliyappan became a name to reckon with in the Tamil publishing world. He gained the reputation of being one of the very few Tamil authors who can authentically and competently present successful management subjects to the common man. Valliyappan can be credited with introducing many management concepts for the first time in Tamil. For instance, his book, Idliyaaga Irungal, is the first in Tamil on the subject of Emotional intelligence. His recent book, Thallu, is on successful motivational techniques followed in the corporate world.

His writings were published by Anna University under the title Nirvaagaththiran Membaadugal as part of its initiative to promote women empowerment. His book on mental health, Mana Azhuththam Virattalaama was published by Kizhakku Publisher's Prodigy imprint, for the benefit of students.

Dr Soma Valliappan has given out many motivational books for the benefit of students and young managers. Some of his popular titles are: Ushaar Ulle Paar, which deals with the Power of Mind; Aaalappirandhavargal Neengal, on leadership qualities; Ulagam Un vasam, on communication skills, Nee Asatharanamanavan, Ellorum Vallaree. His two books, Idliyaaga Irungal and Alla Alla Panam are in the list of recommended readings for students of a college in Madurai, and Bharathiar University, Coimbatore, respectively.

He has written about Economics in Tamil (Nattu kannaku 1 and Nattu Kannaku 2) and also about Demonetization (Athirntha India).

Dr Soma Valliappan researched about Management thoughts in Kambaramayanam and has written a book- Management Guru Kamban 
Soma Valliappan' first book in English, You vs You - Everything about Emotional Intelligence published in 2013 won a prize from ISTD. His second English book, Bulls and Bears - All about Shares was published in 2015. Third one i You are extraordinary- for School students.

Columns
In the late 1990s, Valliyappan wrote several self-development articles for magazines including Mangaiyar Malar under the pen name, SMV. He had written over 40 articles – including center-page articles, about human resource and self-development in Dinamani newspaper.

Valliyappan writes columns on business and investment in leading Tamil periodicals including Ananda Vikatan, Kumudam, kumudham Snekithi, Naanayam Vikadan. He writes in general interest magazines like Amuda Surabi, Puthiya thalaimurai, Pavayar malar, Namadhu Nambikkai, and Grassroot, on personality development.

Valliyappan writes 4th page articles in leading Tamil daily, Thinathanthi

Creative Writing
Valliappan has written several short stories in the 1990s that were published in leading Tamil magazines including Kalki, Ananda Vikatan, Mangaiyar Malar, Tamilarasi, and Dinamalar Varamalar. His short story titled Paathippugal, published in 1993, was adjudged as the best short story of the month by Ilakkiya Sinthanaigal, a Tamil literary association.

His published works in creative writing also include a short story collection (reprint title: Nejam Ellam Nee by Apple Publications, Gemini Circle (Kizaku pathpakam) and a novel, Pattampoochigalin Kannammoochi Kaalam (Manivasakar).

Interviews
He appears on popular Tamil TV channels including: Star Vijay, Kalaignar Seithigal, Jaya, Jaya Plus, and Makkal TV. His talks and Interviews are aired by All India Radio Channel 2, Radio Mirchi, Aha FM, Radio City, Radio 1 and Singapore Oli. Kumudam.com publishes Valliyappan's interviews in multiple media formats including video in their Web TV. He has written Panam pannalaam Panam, Panam for 24 weeks in popular Tamil weekly Ananda Vikatan and Panam Panna Neenga Readya, a 19-week series, Panam sila sandhegangal, a 20-week series, and Paname Oodivaa, a 29-week series for Popular Kumudam, Tamil weekly magazine, all on financial Management.

He had published audio books too.

Books List
Soma Valliappan has authored about 70 books in various topics

Self Development
 Idliyaaga Irungal (Emotional Intelligence ) New Horizon Media, Chennai
 Emotional Intelligence 2.0 -New Horizon Media, Chennai
 Teen tharigada ( For Tenn Agers) New Horizon Media, Chennai
 Thadaiyedhumillai ( Self Development- Collection of Articles written in Dinamani)- Vijaya pathippagam, Coimbatore
 Adhigaaram Alla, Anbu- ( Self Development- Collection of Articles written in Dinamani)- Vijaya pathippagam, Coimbatore
 Appa Magan (Father-son relationship) -Vijaya pathippagam, Coimbatore
 Mana Azhuththam Virattalaama (For School Students on Stress Management- for UNESCO) Prodigey-NHM
 kathal Mudal thiruman varai (About Marriage & Husband and Wife relationship), NHM
 Nallathaka Nallu Varthai (Self Development- Collection of Articles written in Dinamani)- Manivasakar Chennai 101
 Ushaar Ulle Paar (About the power of the mind) NHM
 Indhamurai Neethaan (for School final students- motivation) Vijaya Pathippagam, Coimbatore
 Neengal Virumbum Vellaiyai Vendruedupathu Epadi (Full details about employment interviews and Group Discusions) NHM
 Thallu  (On Motivation & Performance Management) NHM
 Munnetram Indha Pakkam (Complete road map for developing & achieving the objectives) Vijaya pathippagam, Coimbatore
 Chinna thuuNdil periya meen - Apple Patipagam
 Sollathathaiyum Sey - Sixth Sense
 IvvaLavuthaana nee - Sixth Sense
 Neengal Asatharanamanavar - NHM Publications
 Ellorum Vallavaree -NHM
 Rasavatham- Ethilum peru veRRi pera - about NLP
 Nerathai uramaakku - Time Management - New Horizon Media, Chennai
 Rasavatham -Ethilum peru vetri (about NLP) NHM Chennai
 Avasaram - udanadiyaka syy veeNdiya smuka porulathaara maaRRangkaL(NHM)
 Nallathaka naalu varthai 
 Nalla manam vazka
 Makizsiyaka valungal

Management
 Aaallappirandhavar Neengal (On Leadership) Revised and expanded Sixth sense publications Chennai 17
 Thittamiduvom Vetriperuvom (Motivation & Planning) Apple publications
 Kaalam Ungal Kaladiyil (On Time Management) NHM, Chennai
 Yaar Nee? (Knowing ones personality and its Characters) NHM
 Ulagam Un Vasam (On Communication ) NHM
 Urudhimattume Vendum (On the importance of the Commitment- Motivation) NHM, Chennai
 Uravugal Menpada (On Interpersonal Relationship) NHM, Chennai
 Sirandha Nirvaagi Yeppadi? (On how to grow in an Organisation- Motivation & Techniques) NHM, Chennai
 Nattu Kannaku (Economics), Sixth Sense publications
 Nattu Kanaku -2 ( Economics) Sixth Sense publications
 Thotathellam Ponagum, Sixth Sense publications
 Manathodu oru sitting ( about Mind) - NHM publications
 Siru thuli perumpaNam - Sixth Sense publications
 Management Guru Kamban - NHM publications
 You vs. You (Emotional Intelligence) Productivity and Quality publishers

Stock Market
 Alla Alla Panam – 1 Revised 2012 (Basics of Stock Market- Complete details- 225 pages) NHM, Chennai
 Alla Alla Panam – 2 Revised 2012 (On Stock Market Fundamental & Technical Analysis- in some detail) NHM
 Alla Alla Panam – 3 (On Stock Markets- Futurs & Options) NHM, Chennai
 Alla Alla Panam – 4 (On Portfolio management- Stocks) NHM, Chennai
 Alla Alla Panam – 5 (Trading in Stock markets- Candles) NHM, Chennai
 Alla Alla Panam – 6 (Mutual Funds) NHM, Chennai
 Alla Alla Panam – 7 (Gold,Silver & Cryptocurrency)NHM, Chennai
 Alla Alla Panam – 8 (Insurance) NHM, Chennai
 Panguchanthai Oru Arimugam ( Brief Introduction to Stock Markets) Prodigy, NHM, Chennai
 Paname Oodivaa  (On various Investment opportunities including FDs, ELSS, PF, ULIPS, GOLD, Stocks etc.) New Horizon Media, Chennai
 Share Market Secrets - Sixth Sense publications
 Sikkanam Semipu Muthaleedu -New Horizon Media, Chennai

Books in Other Languages

 Bulls & Bears - All about Shares - English - Productivity & Quality Publishing
 Share Bazzar Secrets - Hindi

Knowledge sharing
Sorgaththin Sonthakaarar (On buying a Flat or House) NHM, Chennai.
K Balachander- Velai Drama Cinema- Sixth Sense

Business
 Thottathellam Ponnaagum (Motivation and details of starting a Business) NHM, Chennai
 Nermaiyaka sampathikka ivvalavu vazikaLaa (Serila that was published in Anada Vikadan- different opportunities to start small businesses) NHM, Chennai
 Number 1 Salesman (Details of Sales- Prospecting to closing the Sale) NHM, Chennai
 Chinna Thoondil Periya Meen (Methods for High Productivity in Personal life) Alagappar Pathippagam, Karaikudi
 siRuthuLi perum paNam - Alagappar Pathippagam Karaikudi

Notes

Tamil Review on 'Alla Alla Panam' Book

Living people
Self-help writers
Year of birth missing (living people)

 https://www.youtube.com/watch?v=F8QGafpOwHQ&t=45s
 https://www.youtube.com/watch?v=6hgfHNTOncQ
 https://www.youtube.com/watch?v=xc_rd-VUoSA&feature=youtube
 https://www.youtube.com/watch?v=8ekMwsCSK8A
 https://www.youtube.com/watch?v=t1lXjWqCk98
 https://www.youtube.com/watch?v=5dQ7TBPIYUc
 https://www.youtube.com/watch?v=Qzi5XZSq7tE
 https://www.youtube.com/watch?v=igkjFavIHo4
 https://www.youtube.com/watch?v=dVJ95pXYXEw
 https://www.youtube.com/watch?v=nnuDFGlNT5U&t=121s
 https://www.youtube.com/watch?v=jxDjUIXS5dI
 https://www.youtube.com/watch?v=HBdZx82tCv8
 https://www.youtube.com/watch?v=8YHQNDeu9vM
 https://www.youtube.com/watch?v=5f9KQodJQr8
 https://www.youtube.com/watch?v=JIcMpwP3K-Y
 https://www.youtube.com/watch?v=zPJ91xHKg5I
 https://www.youtube.com/watch?v=ZZ9kKRWl07s
 https://www.youtube.com/watch?v=hI1HPCICpLw&t=4s
 https://www.youtube.com/watch?v=2MUWXJ_KG2s
 https://www.youtube.com/watch?v=AG400e3zXXg
 https://www.youtube.com/watch?v=AsglWAjGcK8
 https://www.youtube.com/watch?v=Sb85nytJ84c
 https://www.youtube.com/watch?v=zSE5yNgExP8
 https://www.youtube.com/watch?v=tg0QUKFUg_E
 https://www.youtube.com/watch?v=7hnY7FL3Oh0
 https://www.youtube.com/watch?v=z7MV8BuTNT4
 https://www.youtube.com/watch?v=bBNU2hYmB7U
 https://www.youtube.com/watch?v=x1INcGDFKMk
 http://www.dinakaran.com/Ladies_Detail.asp?Nid=1236&cat=501
 http://www.adrasaka.com/2013/01/blog-post_3241.html
 http://ns7.tv/ta/positive-and-negative-demonetisation.html
 http://www.dinamani.com/junction/ellorum-vallavarey/
 https://www.youtube.com/watch?v=4SRaGVZypSY
 https://www.youtube.com/watch?v=cpmHgbn_dH4&t=5s
 https://www.youtube.com/watch?v=swZ152uHCr0
 https://www.youtube.com/watch?v=IcNkOe0VSc8
 https://www.youtube.com/watch?v=Ycyh_wouUWg&t=1094s
 http://www.vikatan.com/news/coverstory/33548.html#vuukle_div
 https://www.youtube.com/watch?v=EP9o5C1iXSU
 https://www.youtube.com/watch?v=YIuN9CBooS4
 https://www.youtube.com/watch?v=d6JwbXwpcEABudget 2017 feb 2017-18
 https://www.youtube.com/watch?v=of_fAewqJNA&t=8s
 https://www.youtube.com/watch?v=4uv-lXiuP_o
 https://www.youtube.com/watch?v=VJXwf302P6o&index=1&list=PL-RDFpvLYFEWCShKiMrhdEw7wL434UOjl
 https://www.youtube.com/watch?v=o9XuP7H7LcE
 https://www.youtube.com/watch?v=dWuoGC3r7ls
 https://www.youtube.com/watch?v=Ycyh_wouUWg&index=2&list=PL1SgYOQ8uzMTDGjxH99rA-6sHzYhcTPn3
 http://newstodaynet.com/chennai/spb-releases-book-director-k-balachander
 https://www.youtube.com/watch?v=ju0RzHM4HwQ
 https://www.youtube.com/watch?v=e2LEa1e3C50* http://newstodaynet.com/chennai/spb-releases-book-director-k-balachander
 https://www.google.co.in/webhp?tab=mw&authuser=2&ei=z7dYWPzoJsWRmQHiobyYBA&ved=0EKkuCAgoAQ#authuser=2&tbm=nws&q=soma+valliappan+
 https://www.youtube.com/watch?v=GVftMi9QPSA
 https://www.youtube.com/watch?v=zrPIh5guKSo
 https://www.youtube.com/watch?v=VAN80OG2plg
 https://www.youtube.com/watch?v=swZ152uHCr0
 https://www.youtube.com/watch?v=IcNkOe0VSc8
 https://www.youtube.com/watch?v=VAN80OG2plg
 https://www.youtube.com/watch?v=u0wC3ZS7_jo
 https://www.youtube.com/watch?v=ju0RzHM4HwQ
 https://www.youtube.com/watch?v=hVE92OiyCVk
 http://hrconclave.iimtrichy.ac.in/
 http://sptc.org.in/motivation-guidance-programme/
 http://www.ppg.edu.in/engg/events.php?page=3
 http://www.mylaporetimes.com/2012/09/international-conference-held-at-vivekanada-college/
 http://vsbcetc.com/photo_gallery/freshers-day-2013/
 http://www.frequency.com/video/neeya-naana-122312/71017073/-/5-11889688
 http://youtube/_JorZzy4Vl4
 http://youtube/ptTrJsyzvAs